The 1935 Quebec general election was held on November 25, 1935, to elect members of the Legislative Assembly of the Province of Quebec, Canada. The incumbent Quebec Liberal Party, led by Louis-Alexandre Taschereau was re-elected, defeating the Action libérale nationale, led by  Paul Gouin, and the Quebec Conservative Party, led by Maurice Duplessis.

It was the fourth and final general election victory in a row for Taschereau, who had held office since 1920.  He would resign less than seven months later due to a scandal.

The Action libérale nationale (ALN) was a newly formed party led by the son of former Liberal premier Lomer Gouin. It was established by former Liberals who had become dissatisfied with the party.  The ALN and Conservatives formed an alliance, the Union Nationale,  to contest this election, and after the election merged to form the Union Nationale as a fully-fledged party, which soon became a dominant political force.

Results

|-
! colspan=2 rowspan=2 | Political party
! rowspan=2 | Party leader
! colspan=4 | MPPs
! colspan=4 | Votes
|-
! Candidates
!1931
!1935
!±
!#
! ±
!%
! ± (pp)
|-
|rowspan="3" |  
|style="text-align:left;" colspan="10"|Government candidates
|-
|style="text-align:left;" |
|style="text-align:left;"|Louis-Alexandre Taschereau
|90
|79
|47
|5
|249,586
|19,146
|46.53
|8.35
|-
|style="text-align:left;" |
|style="text-align:left;"|–
|3
|–
|–
|–
|615
|2,172
|0.11
|0.46
|-
|rowspan="3" |  
|style="text-align:left;" colspan="10"|Union Nationale alliance
|-
|style="text-align:left;" |
|style="text-align:left;"|Paul Gouin
|53
|–
|25
|25
|158,130
|
|29.48
|
|-
|style="text-align:left;" |
|style="text-align:left;"|Maurice Duplessis
|32
|11
|17
|6
|101,544
|111,679
|18.93
|24.61
|-
|rowspan="3" |  
|style="text-align:left;" colspan="10"|Opposition candidates
|-
|style="text-align:left;" |
|style="text-align:left;"|–
|1
|–
|–
|–
|1,532
|
|0.29
|
|-
|style="text-align:left;" |
|style="text-align:left;"|–
|1
|–
|–
|–
|94
|12
|0.02
|–
|-
|rowspan="5" |  
|style="text-align:left;" colspan="10"|Other candidates
|-
|style="text-align:left;" |
|style="text-align:left;"|–
|19
|–
|1
|1
|21,587
|20,522
|4.02
|3.80
|-
|style="text-align:left;" |
|style="text-align:left;"|–
|2
|–
|–
|–
|2,238
|1,757
|0.42
|0.32
|-
|style="text-align:left;" |
|style="text-align:left;"|–
|1
|–
|–
|–
|998
|
|0.19
|
|-
|style="text-align:left;" |
|style="text-align:left;"|–
|1
|–
|–
|–
|37
|547
|–
|0.12
|-
! colspan="3" style="text-align:left;" | Total
| 200
! " colspan="3"| 90
! " colspan="2"| 536,361
! " colspan="2"| 100%
|-
| colspan="7" style="text-align:left;" | Rejected ballots
| 15,232
| 11,042
| colspan="2"|
|-
| colspan="7" style="text-align:left;" | Voter turnout
| 551,593
| 57,708
| 76.16
| 0.85
|-
| colspan="7" style="text-align:left;" | Registered electors (contested ridings only)
| 724,260
| 82,936
| colspan="2"|
|-
| colspan="5" style="text-align:left;" | Candidates returned by acclamation
| 3
| 3
| colspan="4"|
|}

See also
 List of Quebec premiers
 Politics of Quebec
 Timeline of Quebec history
 List of Quebec political parties
 19th Legislative Assembly of Quebec

Further reading

References

Quebec general election
Elections in Quebec
General election
Quebec general election